Michael Yin (born March 14, 1986) is an American politician and a Democratic member of the Wyoming House of Representatives representing District 16. He was elected on November 6, 2018. He is Wyoming's first Chinese-American legislator.

Career
Prior to his election to the Wyoming House of Representatives, Yin served as vice chair for the Teton County Democratic Party. He had also worked in the technology industry for a decade.

Wyoming House of Representatives

Yin ran unopposed for the Democratic nomination and defeated Republican Barbara Allen in the general election.

Allen led in a local poll conducted by the Buckrail media outlet prior to the election.

References

External links
Profile from Ballotpedia

1986 births
21st-century American politicians
American politicians of Chinese descent
Asian-American people in Wyoming politics
Carnegie Mellon University alumni
Democratic Party members of the Wyoming House of Representatives
Living people
People from Jackson, Wyoming